Vacha is an urban locality (a work settlement) and the administrative center of Vachsky District of Nizhny Novgorod Oblast, Russia. Population:

History
It was founded in 1588. Urban-type settlement status was granted to it in 1938.

References

Urban-type settlements in Nizhny Novgorod Oblast
Vachsky District
Muromsky Uyezd